George Henry Starnagle (October 6, 1873 – February 15, 1946) was a Major League Baseball catcher who played for one season. Born George Henry Steuernagel, he played for the Cleveland Bronchos for one game on September 14 during the 1902 Cleveland Bronchos season.

External links

1873 births
1946 deaths
Major League Baseball catchers
Cleveland Bronchos players
Baseball players from Illinois
Terre Haute Hottentots players
Colorado Springs Millionaires players
Minneapolis Millers (baseball) players
Sioux City Soos players
Sioux City Packers players
Altoona Mountaineers players
Montreal Royals players
Toronto Maple Leafs (International League) players
Rochester Bronchos players